Shenyangzhan is a station on Line 1 of the Shenyang Metro. It is adjacent to Shenyang railway station. The station opened on 27 September 2010.

Station Layout

References 

Railway stations in China opened in 2010
Shenyang Metro stations